Moon Dae-Sung (born September 3, 1976) is a retired 6 ft 3 in (1.91 m) 200 lb (91 kg) Olympic taekwondo athlete from South Korea. He won a gold medal at the 2004 Olympics held in Athens, Greece, in the heavyweight division after knocking out Greece's Alexandros Nikolaidis with a reverse kick.

Career
He entered Dong-A University on a taekwondo scholarship in 1995 and performed consistently well in national competitions during his college years, though usually overshadowed by the dominant heavyweight champion Kim Je-Gyoung.

Upon graduation from Dong-A University in Busan, South Korea in 1999, Moon became a member of the Samsung Corporation Professional Taekwondo team. Many considered Moon to be the next Kim Je-Gyoung, two time Olympic Gold Medalist and also a member of the Samsung Professional Team and graduate of Dong-A University, in the heavyweight division of the Korean National team.

Since his high profile win at the Athens Olympic Games, Moon has become a well known celebrity in South Korea, owing to his performance in the Gold Medal round. He has become the official Audi Automobile Company's spokesman and has made numerous television and public appearances.

Notable abilities which make him an elite and consistent athlete are: Left leg roundhouse kick, left leg back kick and reverse (with which he knocked out Alexandros Nikolaidis) as well as a solid grasp of other core techniques indispensable to fighting in high level international and Korean domestic competitions.

Post career

As IOC member
In August 2008 he was elected as a member of the International Olympic Committee by the 120th IOC Session.

As a politician
Moon ran for being a lawmaker in the first (gap) legislative district of Saha-gu under the Saenuri Party banner in 2012; he won the election.

Plagiarism scandal

His doctoral thesis for Kookmin University, "Effect of Proprioceptive Neuromuscular Facilitation (PNF) on Flexibility and Isokinetic Muscle Strength in Taekwondo Player", came to the attention of the public media in South Korea as a "copy-and-paste" plagiarism. There are a number of "copy-and-paste" paragraphs in introduction, literature review, and discussion section of the thesis.

The scandal later affected his rookie political career, but he decided to stay in the ruling party and maintained his innocence.

In April 2012, the  research ethics committee of the Kookmin University announced:
"The research subject of the doctoral thesis by Moon Dae-sung and part of the purpose of the research of his thesis overlap with those of a doctoral thesis by a person surnamed Kim at Myongji University. Not only that but a significant portion of the writing in the introduction, the theoretical background and the arguments in the two theses are so identical that we concluded this goes beyond what is normally permitted by the academic community."

Minutes after the school’s announcement, Moon issued a statement to announce his departure from the ruling party.

In March 2014, Kookmin University officially canceled his PhD.  Moon launched a nullification lawsuit, which his opponents believe is a tactic to keep his seat in the IOC as well as the ruling Saenuri Party.

References

External links
 
 

1976 births
Living people
South Korean male taekwondo practitioners
Olympic taekwondo practitioners of South Korea
Taekwondo practitioners at the 2004 Summer Olympics
Olympic gold medalists for South Korea
International Olympic Committee members
Sportspeople from Incheon
Asian Games medalists in taekwondo
Olympic medalists in taekwondo
Liberty Korea Party politicians
Taekwondo practitioners at the 2002 Asian Games
People involved in plagiarism controversies
Members of the National Assembly (South Korea)
Medalists at the 2004 Summer Olympics
Asian Games gold medalists for South Korea
Medalists at the 2002 Asian Games
World Taekwondo Championships medalists
Asian Taekwondo Championships medalists
20th-century South Korean people
21st-century South Korean people
Dong-a University alumni